Wimanius is a mixosaurian ichthyosaur, and the only genus in the family Wimaniidae. It existed during the Triassic Period in what is now Switzerland. It was described by Maisch and Matzke in 1998 based on fossils found in the Monte San Giorgio Formation, and the type species is Wimanius odontopalatus.

See also 
 List of ichthyosaurs
 Timeline of ichthyosaur research

References 

Triassic ichthyosaurs
Triassic reptiles of Europe
Fossils of Switzerland
Fossil taxa described in 1998
Ichthyosauromorph genera